Lars von Trier (né Trier; 30 April 1956) is a Danish filmmaker, actor, and lyricist. He is the creator of the avant-garde filmmaking movement Dogme 95 alongside fellow director Thomas Vinterberg, as well as founder and shareholder of the Danish film production company Zentropa Films, which has sold more than 350million tickets and garnered multiple awards including two Academy Awards for Best International Feature Film.

Early life and education 
Von Trier was born in Kongens Lyngby, Denmark, north of Copenhagen, to Inger Høst and Fritz Michael Hartmann (the head of Denmark's Ministry of Social Affairs and a World War II resistance fighter). He received his surname from Høst's husband, Ulf Trier, whom he believed to be his biological father until 1989.

He studied film theory at the University of Copenhagen and film direction at the National Film School of Denmark. At 25, he won two Best School Film awards at the Munich International Festival of Film Schools for Nocturne and Last Detail. The same year, he added the nobiliary particle "von" to his name, possibly as a satirical homage to the equally self-invented titles of directors Erich von Stroheim and Josef von Sternberg, and saw his graduation film Images of Liberation released as a theatrical feature.

Career

1984–1994: Career beginnings and the Europa trilogy 
In 1984, The Element of Crime, von Trier's breakthrough film, received twelve awards at seven international festivals including the Technical Grand Prize at Cannes, and a nomination for the Palme d'Or. The film's slow, non-linear pace, innovative and multi-leveled plot design, and dark dreamlike visual effects combine to create an allegory for traumatic European historical events.

Von Trier's next film, Epidemic (1987), was also shown at Cannes in the Un Certain Regard section, and featured two story lines that ultimately collide: the chronicle of two filmmakers (played by vonTrier and screenwriter Niels Vørse) in the midst of developing a new project, and a dark science fiction tale of a futuristic plaguethe very film von Trier and Vørsel are depicted making. He next directed Medea (1988) for television, based on a screenplay by Carl Th. Dreyer and starring Udo Kier, which won the Jean d'Arcy prize in France. 

Von Trier has referred to his films as falling into thematic and stylistic trilogies. This pattern began with The Element of Crime (1984), the first of the Europa trilogy, which illuminated traumatic periods in Europe both in the past and the future. It also includes Epidemic. He completed the trilogy in 1991 with Europa (released as Zentropa in the US), which won the Prix duJury at the 1991 Cannes Film Festival, and picked up awards at other major festivals. In 1990 he also directed the music video for the song "Bakerman" by Laid Back. This video was re-used in 2006 by the English DJ and artist Shaun Baker in his remake of the song.

Seeking financial independence and creative control over their projects, in 1992 vonTrier and producer Peter Aalbæk Jensen founded the film production company Zentropa Entertainment. Named after a fictional railway company in Europa, their most recent film at the time, Zentropa has produced many movies other than Trier's own, as well as several television series. It has also produced hardcore sex films: Constance (1998), Pink Prison (1999), HotMen CoolBoyz (2000), and All About Anna (2005). To make money for his newly founded company, vonTrier made The Kingdom (Danish title Riget, 1994) and The KingdomII (RigetII, 1997), a pair of miniseries recorded in the Danish national hospital, the name "Riget" being a colloquial name for the hospital known as Rigshospitalet (lit. The Kingdom's Hospital) in Danish. A projected third season of the series was derailed by the death in 1998 of Ernst-Hugo Järegård, who played Dr. Helmer, and that of Kirsten Rolffes, who played Mrs. Drusse, in 2000, two of the major characters, which led to the series' cancellation.

1995–2000: the Dogme 95 manifesto, and the Golden Heart trilogy 

In 1995, von Trier and Thomas Vinterberg presented their manifesto for a new cinematic movement, which they called Dogme 95. The Dogme95 concept, which led to international interest in Danish film, inspired filmmakers all over the world. It required filmmakers to shirk several common techniques in modern filmmaking, such as studio lighting, sets, costumes, and non-diegtic music. In 2008, together with their fellow Dogme directors Kristian Levring and Søren Kragh-Jacobsen, vonTrier and Thomas Vinterberg received the European film award for European Achievement in World Cinema.

In 1996 von Trier conducted an unusual theatrical experiment in Copenhagen involving 53 actors, which he titled Psychomobile1: The World Clock. A documentary chronicling the project was directed by Jesper Jargil, and was released in 2000 with the title De Udstillede (The Exhibited).

Von Trier achieved international success with his Golden Heart trilogy. Each film in the trilogy is about naive heroines who maintain their "golden hearts" despite the tragedies they experience. This trilogy consists of Breaking the Waves (1996), The Idiots (1998), and Dancer in the Dark (2000). While all three films are sometimes associated with the Dogme 95 movement, The Idiots was the only one to meet all the necessary criteria to be "certified" as such.

Breaking the Waves won the Grand Prix at the Cannes Film Festival and featured Emily Watson, who was nominated for the Academy Award for Best Actress. Its grainy images, and hand-held photography, pointed towards Dogme95 but violated several of the manifesto's rules. The second film in the trilogy, The Idiots, was nominated for a Palme d'Or, with which he was presented in person at the 1998 Cannes Film Festival, despite his dislike of traveling. In 2000, von Trier premiered Dancer in the Dark, a musical featuring Icelandic musician Björk, which won the Palme d'Or at Cannes. The song "I've Seen It All" (co-written by vonTrier) received an Academy Award nomination for Best Original Song.

2003–2008: The Land of Opportunities and other works 

The Five Obstructions (2003), made by vonTrier and Jørgen Leth, is a documentary that incorporates lengthy sections of experimental films. The premise is that vonTrier challenges Leth, his friend and mentor, to remake his 1967 experimental short The Perfect Human five times, each time with a different or obstacle.

His next proposed trilogy, Land of Opportunities, consists of Dogville (2003), Manderlay (2005), and the unmade . The first two installments were shot with the same distinctive, extremely stylized approach, with the actors performing on a bare sound stage with no decoration, with buildings' walls marked by chalk lines on the floor, a style inspired by 1970s televised theatre. Dogville starred Nicole Kidman as Grace Margaret Mulligan, a role taken by Bryce Dallas Howard for Manderlay. Both films feature an ensemble cast including Harriet Andersson, Lauren Bacall, James Caan, Danny Glover, and Willem Dafoe. The films question various issues relating to American society, such as intolerance and slavery.

In 2006, von Trier released the Danish-language comedy film, The Boss of It All, which was shot using an experimental process he named Automavision, involving the director choosing the best possible fixed camera position, then allowing a computer to randomly choose when to tilt, pan, or zoom. He followed this with an autobiographical film, The Early Years: Erik Nietzsche Part 1 in 2007, which von Trier wrote and Jacob Thuesen directed, a film that tells the story of vonTrier's years as a student at the National Film School of Denmark. It stars Jonatan Spang as vonTrier's alter ego, called "Erik Nietzsche", and is narrated by vonTrier himself, with all main characters in the film being based on real people from the Danish film industry. The thinly veiled portrayals include Jens Albinus as director Nils Malmros, Dejan Čukić as screenwriter Mogens Rukov, and Søren Pilmark.

2009–2014: The Depression trilogy 
The Depression trilogy consists of Antichrist, Melancholia, and Nymphomaniac. The three films star Charlotte Gainsbourg, and deal with characters who suffer depression or grief in different ways. This trilogy is said to represent the depression that Trier himself experiences.

Antichrist follows "a grieving couple who retreat to their cabin in the woods, hoping a return to Eden will repair their broken hearts and troubled marriage; but nature takes its course and things go from bad to worse". The film stars Willem Dafoe and Gainsbourg. It premiered in competition at the 2009 Cannes Film Festival, where the festival's jury honoured the movie by giving the Best Actress award to Gainsbourg.

Melancholia, released in 2011, is an apocalyptic drama about two depressive sisters played by Kirsten Dunst and Gainsbourg, the former of whom marries just before a rogue planet is about to collide with Earth. The film was in competition at the 2011 Cannes Film Festival, where it won the Best Actress award for Dunst.

Following Melancholia, von Trier began the production of Nymphomaniac, a film about the sexual awakening of a woman played by Gainsbourg. In early December 2013, a four-hour version shown to the press in a private preview session. The cast also included Stellan Skarsgård (in his sixth film for von Trier), Shia LaBeouf, Willem Dafoe, Jamie Bell, Christian Slater, and Uma Thurman. In response to claims that he had merely created a "porn film", Skarsgård stated "... if you look at this film, it's actually a really bad porn movie, even if you fast forward. And after a while you find you don't even react to the explicit scenes. They become as natural as seeing someone eating a bowl of cereal." For its public release in the United Kingdom, the film was divided into two volumes. The film premiered in the UK on 22February 2014.

In interviews prior to the film's release, Gainsbourg and co-star Stacy Martin revealed that prosthetic vaginas, body doubles, and special effects were used for the production of the film. Martin also stated that the film's characters were a reflection of the director himself, and referred to the experience as an "honour" that she enjoyed. The film was also released in two "volumes" for the Australian release on 20 March 2014, with an interval separating the back-to-back sections. In February 2014, an uncensored version of Volume I was shown at the Berlin Film Festival, with no announcement of when or if the complete five-and-a-half-hour Nymphomaniac would be made available to the public. The complete version premiered at the 2014 Venice Film Festival and was shortly afterward released in a limited theatrical run worldwide that fall.

2015–2018: The House That Jack Built and the return to Cannes 
In 2015, von Trier began work on a new feature film, The House That Jack Built, which was originally planned as an eight-part television series. The story is about a serial killer, seen from the murderer's point of view. It starred Matt Dillon in the title role, alongside Bruno Ganz, Riley Keough and Sofie Gråbøl. Shooting started in March 2017 in Sweden, before moving to Copenhagen in May.

In February 2017, von Trier explained that the film "celebrates the idea that life is evil and soulless, which is sadly proven by the recent rise of the Homo trumpus – the rat king". The film premiered at the Cannes Film Festival in May 2018. Despite more than a hundred walkouts by audience members, the film still received a 10-minute standing ovation.

2019–present: Revival to Riget and planned feature film, Études 
After the release of The House That Jack Built, von Trier planned to produce Études, an anthology film consisting of ten black and white segments, each ten minutes long, inspired by the musical form. In December 2020, it was announced he would produce a belated third and final season of The Kingdom, titled The Kingdom Exodus. It was also announced that Søren Pilmark would return as Jørgen 'Hook' Krogshøj, as would Ghita Nørby as Rigmor Mortensen, alongside a new cast including Mikael Persbrandt as Dr. Helmer, Jr. It was shot in 2021, consisting of five episodes to be released in November 2022. The miniseries premiered out of competition at the Venice Film Festival as a five-hour feature length film. It received positive reviews from critics.

Aesthetics, themes, and style of working 
Trier's career has spanned more than four decades and most of his works have gained notoriety for his trademarks including portrayal of women as main characters in several films, European frequent collaborators (particularly Jean-Marc Barr, Udo Kier and Stellan Skarsgård), different thematic trilogies, extreme cinema, mature subject matters, handheld camerawork, Rasmussen's costume design, genre and technical innovation, confrontational examination of existential, social, and political issues, and his treatment of subjects such as mercy, sacrifice, and mental health.

Influences 
Von Trier is heavily influenced by the work of Carl Theodor Dreyer and the film The Night Porter. He was so inspired by the short film The Perfect Human, directed by Jørgen Leth, that he challenged Leth to redo the short five times in the feature film The Five Obstructions.

Writing 
Von Trier's writing style has been heavily influenced by his work with actors on set, as well as the Dogme 95 manifesto that he co-authored. In an interview with Creative Screenwriting, he described his process as "writing a sketch and keep[ing] the story simple...then part of the script work is with the actors." He again cites Dreyer as an influence, pointing to his method of overwriting his scripts, then significantly cutting the length down. Reflecting on the storytelling across his body of work, von Trier said, "all the stories are about a realist who comes into conflict with life. I'm not crazy about real life, and real life is not crazy about me."

Filming techniques 
Von Trier has said that "a film should be like a stone in your shoe". To create original art he feels that filmmakers must distinguish themselves stylistically from other films, often by placing restrictions on the film making process. The most famous such restriction is the cinematic "vow of chastity" of the Dogme 95 movement. In Dancer in the Dark, he used jump shots and dramatically different color palettes and camera techniques for the "real world" and musical portions of the film,.

Von Trier often shoots digitally and operates the camera himself, preferring to continuously shoot the actors in-character without stopping between takes. In Dogville he let actors stay in character for hours, in the style of method acting. These techniques often put great strain on the actors, most famously with Björk during the filming of Dancer in the Dark.

Von Trier would later return to explicit images in Antichrist (2009), exploring darker themes, but he ran into problems when he tried once more with Nymphomaniac, which had 90 minutes cut out (reducing it from five-and-one-half to four hours) for its international release in 2013 in order to be commercially viable, taking nearly a year to be shown complete anywhere in an uncensored director's cut.

While Lars von Trier commissioned new musical compositions for his early films, his more recent work has made use of existing music. With Nymphomaniac, the principle of musical eclecticism is also applied within the film. He often heavily edits compositions to manipulate and provoke the audience.

Approach to actors 
In an interview for IndieWire, von Trier compared his approach to actors with "how a chef would work with a potato or a piece of meat", clarifying that working with actors has differed on each film based on the production conditions. He has occasionally courted controversy by his treatment of his lead actresses. He and Björk famously fell out during the shooting of Dancer in the Dark, to the point where she would abscond from filming for days at a time. She stated that von Trier, who shattered a monitor while it was next to her, that "you can take quite sexist film directors like Woody Allen or Stanley Kubrick and still they are the one that provide the soul to their movies. In Lars von Trier's case it is not so and he knows it. He needs a female to provide his work soul. And he envies them and hates them for it. So he has to destroy them during the filming. And hide the evidence."

Nicole Kidman, who starred in von Trier's Dogville, said in an interview with ABC Radio National that she tried to quit the film several times in response to comments von Trier made on set, often while inebriated, "but I say this laughing...I didn't do the sequel but I'm still very good friends with him, strangely enough, because I admire his honesty and I see him as an artist, and I say, my gosh, it's such a hard world now to have a unique voice, and he certainly has that."

However, other actresses he has worked with, such as Kirsten Dunst and Charlotte Gainsbourg have spoken out in defence of his approach. Nymphomaniac star Stacy Martin has stated that he never forced her to do anything that was outside her comfort zone. She said "I don't think he's a misogynist. The fact that he sometimes depicts women as troubled or dangerous or dark or even evil; that doesn't automatically make him anti-feminist. It's a very dated argument. I think that Lars loves women."

Personal life

Family 

In 1989, von Trier's mother told him on her deathbed that the man von Trier's biological father was not the man who raised him, but her former employer, Fritz Michael Hartmann (1909–2000), who was descended from a long line of Danish classical musicians. Hartmann's grandfather was Emil Hartmann, and his great-grandfather J. P. E. Hartmann. His uncles included Niels Gade and Johan Ernst Hartmann, and Niels Viggo Bentzon was his cousin. She stated that she did this to give her son "artistic genes". Von Trier has jokingly said that while he believed he had a Jewish background, he is "really more of a Nazi."

During the German occupation of Denmark, Hartmann in fact joined a resistance group, actively counteracting any pro-German and pro-Nazi colleagues in his civil service department. Another member of this resistance group was Hartmann's colleague Viggo Kampmann, who would later become prime minister of Denmark. After vonTrier had four awkward meetings with his biological father, Hartmann refused further contact.

Family background and political and religious views 
Von Trier's mother considered herself a communist, while Ulf Trier was a social democrat. Both were committed nudists, and vonTrier went on several childhood holidays to nudist camps. They regarded the disciplining of children as reactionary. Von Trier has noted that he was brought up in an atheist family, and that although Ulf Trier was Jewish, he was not religious. His parents did not allow much room in their household for "feelings, religion, or enjoyment", and also refused to make any rules for their children, with complex effects upon vonTrier's personality and development.

In a 2005 interview with Die Zeit, vonTrier said, "I don't know if I'm all that Catholic really. I'm probably not. Denmark is a very Protestant country. Perhaps I only turned Catholic to piss off a few of my countrymen." In 2009, he said, "I'm a very bad Catholic. In fact I'm becoming more and more of an atheist."

Health

Mental health
Von Trier suffers from various fears and phobias, including an intense fear of flying. This fear frequently places severe constraints on him and his crew, necessitating that virtually all of his films be shot in either Denmark or Sweden.

On numerous occasions, he has stated that he suffers from occasional depression which renders him incapable of doing his work and unable to fulfill social obligations.

Parkinson's disease
On 8 August 2022, it was announced that von Trier had been diagnosed with Parkinson's disease. According to Variety, von Trier plans to take a break from filmmaking to adjust to his new life with the disease, saying: "I will take a little break and find out what to do, but I certainly hope that my condition will be better. It’s a disease you can’t take away; you can work with the symptoms, though.”

Reception 

Some of vonTrier's films have been critically acclaimed, particularly Europa, Breaking the Waves, and Melancholia.

Controversies

Nazi remarks during Cannes interview about Melancholia's premiere 
In May 2011, known to be provocative in interviews, vonTrier's remarks during the press conference before the premiere of Melancholia in Cannes caused significant controversy in the media, leading the festival to declare him persona non grata. He was therefore banned from Cannes for one year, although Melancholia still competed in that year's competition.

Minutes before the end of the press conference, von Trier was asked about his German roots and the Nazi aesthetic, in response to his description of the film's genre as "German romance". He joked that since he was "no longer Jewish," having been told the truth about his biological father, he now "understands" and "sympathizes" with Hitler, that he is not against the Jews except for Israel which is "a pain in the ass" and that he is a Nazi. Von Trier was branded an antisemite for his remarks. He released a formal apology immediately after the press conference and kept apologizing for his joke during all of the interviews he gave in the weeks following the incident, admitting that he was not sober, and saying that he did not need to explain that he is not a Nazi. However, in 2019, von Trier stated that he made this remark at the "only press conference I ever had when I was sober."

The actors of Melancholia who were present during the incident – Dunst, Gainsbourg, Skarsgård – defended the director, pointing to his provocative sense of humor and his depression. He refused to attend a private press screening of his subsequent feature Nymphomaniac. In the director's defense, Skarsgård stated at the screening, "Everyone knows he's not a Nazi, and it was disgraceful the way the press had these headlines saying he was." The director of the Cannes festival later called the controversy "unfair" and as "stupid" as vonTrier's bad joke, concluding that his films are welcome at the festival and that vonTrier is considered a "friend".

Sex and violence in films 
Several of his films – notably The Idiots (1998), Antichrist (2009), and The House That Jack Built (2018) – contain explicit content that has generated controversy. At the 2018 Cannes Film Festival, approximately 100 audience members walked out of the premiere of The House That Jack Built.

Sexual harassment allegations 
In October 2017, Björk posted on her Facebook page that she had been sexually harassed by a "Danish film director she worked with". The Los Angeles Times found evidence identifying von Trier as the director in question. Von Trier has apologized for psychologically abusing her but rejected Björk's allegation that he sexually harassed her during the making of the film Dancer in the Dark, and said "That was not the case. But that we were definitely not friends, that's a fact," to Danish daily Jyllands-Posten in its online edition. Peter Aalbaek Jensen, the producer of Dancer in the Dark, told Jyllands-Posten that "As far as I remember we were the victims. That woman was stronger than both Lars von Trier and me and our company put together. She dictated everything and was about to close a movie of 100M kroner [$16M]."
Following von Trier's statement, Björk released a further statement offering more details about her experience, while her manager, Derek Birkett, also condemned von Trier's alleged past actions.

The Guardian later found that Zentropa, which Jensen runs and von Trier founded, had an endemic culture of sexual harassment. Jensen stepped down as CEO when further allegations of harassment came to light in 2017, although he is still active as an executive producer in recent works.

Animal cruelty during filming 
A donkey was slaughtered for dramatic purposes during production of Manderlay, an act that caused actors including John C. Reilly to quit the film in protest of its cruelty to animals. The scene was cut from the film before it was released.

Although The House that Jack Built was praised by animal rights organization PETA, audiences criticised a scene involving the main character's mutilation of a duckling as a child.

Filmography

Films

Frequent collaborators 
Von Trier often works more than once with actors and production members. Manon Rasmussen was the only crew member as a costume designer to collaborate with von Trier in all of his works (except Medea and The Idiots) since The Element of Crime (1984). His first, but initial acting collaborator for The Element of Crime was Leif Magnusson, who appeared in his role as a hotel guest, yet continued to appear again in the last two films as different minor roles for his first trilogy until his acting retirement in the early 1990s. His main crew members and producer team has remained intact since Europa. Many of his recurring actors have expressed their devotion to von Trier. European actors Jean-Marc Barr, Udo Kier, and Stellan Skarsgård have all appeared across several von Trier films. With the exception of Medea, The Kingdom, his incompleted "USA Trilogy", and The House that Jack Built; British-French actress Charlotte Gainsbourg and Swedish actor Leif Magnusson are the only two acting collaborators (excluding himself) to have appeared in all installments of two of his trilogies, taking the lead roles in Depression for the former and minor roles in Europa for the latter.

Note: This list shows only the actors (in alphabetical order only) who have collaborated with von Trier in three or more productions.

Awards and honors 
Among his more than 100 awards and 200 nominations at film festivals worldwide, von Trier has received: the Palme d'Or (for Dancer in the Dark), the Grand Prix (for Breaking the Waves), the Prix du Jury (for Europa), and the Technical Grand Prize (for The Element of Crime and Europa) at the Cannes Film Festival. Von Trier has also received both Golden Globe Award and Academy Award nomination for the former.

 In von Trier's second trilogy, Golden Heart, is the first franchise or trilogy to have won both Bodil and Robert for Best Actress in a Leading Role, respectively Emily Watson, Bodil Jorgensen, and Björk, while Watson and Björk also have won the European for Best Actress.
 Also in Golden Heart, three of them have nominated the Palme d'Or, with the latter won.
 In von Trier's fourth trilogy, Depression, is the first franchise or trilogy to have sweep the Robert for Best Danish Film, Best Director, Best Screenplay, Best Cinematography, Best Editing, Best Sound, and Best Visual Effects.

Notes 
 1^ Dimension was originally intended a feature-length gangster film with each 33 years of development as for 2024 per theatrical release, but he was lost interest in the project after the death of Cartlidge, Constantine, and Hugo Järegård, in which he completes one of the footages into a short film instead.

References

Further reading 
 
 
 
 
 
 Rudolph, Pascal (2020). "Björk on the Gallows: Performance, Persona, and Authenticity in Lars von Trier’s Dancer in the Dark", in IASPM Journal 10/1, 22–42. DOI: https://doi.org/10.5429/2079-3871(2020)v10i1.3en.
 Rudolph, Pascal (2022). Präexistente Musik im Film: Klangwelten im Kino des Lars von Trier (in German). edition text + kritik. DOI https://doi.org/10.5771/9783967077582.
 Rudolph, Pascal (2023). "The Musical Idea Work Group: Production and Reception of Pre-existing Music in Film", in Twentieth-Century Music 20/2, DOI: https://doi.org/10.1017/S1478572222000214.

External links 

 Zentropa official website – von Trier's production company
 
 
 Senses of Cinema: Great Directors Critical Database
 The Burden From Donald Duck. An interview with Lars von Trier Video by Louisiana Channel

 
1956 births
Living people
Converts to Roman Catholicism
Danish experimental filmmakers
Danish people of German descent
Danish Roman Catholics
Danish male screenwriters
Danish documentary film directors
Directors of Palme d'Or winners
English-language film directors
European Film Award for Best Director winners
Film directors from Copenhagen
Hartmann family
German-language film directors
Knights of the Order of the Dannebrog
People from Kongens Lyngby
Spanish-language film directors
Sun in a Net Awards winners
Postmodernist filmmakers
People with Parkinson's disease
Film controversies
Film controversies in France
Obscenity controversies in film
Animal cruelty incidents in film
Political controversies in film